Route 417, also known as Pacquet Road, is a short  north–south highway on the Baie Verte Peninsula of Newfoundland in the Canadian Province of Newfoundland and Labrador. It connects the towns of Pacquet and Woodstock with Route 414 (La Scie Highway).

Route description

Route 417 begins at an intersection with Route 414 and it heads north through rural wooded areas for a few kilometres. It now passes through Woodstock, where it makes a sharp left to follow along the waters edge just west of downtown, before winding its way through hilly terrain for a few more kilometres. The highway now enters Pacquet, where it winds its way through town before coming to a dead end in a neighbourhood.

Major intersections

References

417